Ladyzhyn is a city of oblast significance in Vinnytsia Oblast, Ukraine.

Gallery

References

External links

 The murder of the Jews of Ladyzhyn during World War II, at Yad Vashem website.

Cities in Vinnytsia Oblast
Podolia Governorate
Cities of regional significance in Ukraine
Holocaust locations in Ukraine
Populated places on the Southern Bug